James Franklin Stewart (June 11, 1939 – November 24, 2012) was an American Major League Baseball utility man and scout.

He was born in Opelika, Alabama, to John and Nelle Stewart, graduating in 1957 from Lafayette High School (Alabama), where he starred in baseball, basketball and track. Stewart then went to Austin Peay State University on Clarksville, Tennessee, where he lettered in those same three sports.

Playing career
Stewart signed with the Chicago Cubs' organization prior to the 1961 baseball season. After three years in the minor leagues, he came to the majors as a middle infielder, making his Cubs' debut at age 24 on September 3, 1963, in a 16–3 loss to the San Francisco Giants in Candlestick Park. His first career at-bat was a pinch-hit flyout against Baseball Hall of Famer Juan Marichal. His first hit came a week later on September 10 in an 8–0 road loss to the St. Louis Cardinals. Again, he was pinch-hitting against a Hall of Famer, Bob Gibson, but this time he hit a double and later singled against Gibson.

He was purchased by the Chicago White Sox on May 22, . He appeared in 24 games for the White Sox between June 21 and July 23, mostly as a pinch hitter, pinch runner and defensive replacement. Sent to Triple-A after July 23, Stewart played in the ChiSox' minor league system until he was drafted by the Cincinnati Reds in the  Rule 5 draft. Due to his versatility in the field, during his three seasons with the Reds, Stewart was known as "Super Sub" as he played every position except pitcher. He played in two games of the 1970 World Series, going hitless in two at-bats as the Reds fell to the Baltimore Orioles in five games.

On November 29, 1971, Stewart was part of the landmark trade that brought Hall of Fame second baseman Joe Morgan, outfielders César Gerónimo and Ed Armbrister, pitcher Jack Billingham and infielder Denis Menke to the Reds; slugger Lee May, Cincinnati second baseman Tommy Helms, and Stewart went to Houston in exchange. Meanwhile, Stewart appeared in 129 games for Houston in a utility role during  and 1973. He played his final major league game at age 34 on September 29, 1973, and was released by the Astros on October 26.

He ended his ten-year major league career with a .237 batting average, 336 hits, 45 doubles, 14 triples, eight home runs and 112 runs batted in. In the field, he played every position except pitcher: left field (179 appearances), second base (122), shortstop (107), center field (43), third base (37), first base (ten), right field (ten), and catcher (one).

Longtime scout
In 1978 he was inducted into the Austin Peay Athletics Hall of Fame.

After his playing days ended, in 1980 Stewart rejoined the Reds, first as a minor league manager and then as a scout. He was a major league scout for Cincinnati from 1984 through 1991, then joined the Philadelphia Phillies as a major league special assignment scout in 1992, remaining in that role until leaving baseball in 2006.

He retired to Florida with his wife Donna. Jimmy Stewart died at age 73 on November 24, 2012, in Odessa, Florida.

References

External links

1939 births
2012 deaths
Austin Peay Governors baseball players
Baseball players from Alabama
Carlsbad Potashers players
Chicago Cubs players
Chicago White Sox players
Cincinnati Reds players
Cincinnati Reds scouts
Eugene Emeralds managers
Hawaii Islanders players
Houston Astros players
Indianapolis Indians players
Major League Baseball infielders
Major League Baseball outfielders
People from Opelika, Alabama
Philadelphia Phillies scouts
St. Cloud Rox players
Salt Lake City Bees players